From the Inside may refer to:

 From the Inside (Alice Cooper album), or the title song, 1978
 From the Inside (Laura Pausini album), 2002
 From the Inside (Lynn Anderson album), or the title song, 1978
 From the Inside (Poco album), or the title song, 1971
 "From the Inside" (Marcia Hines song), 1975
 "From the Inside" (Linkin Park song), 2004
 "From the Inside" (video game), 2022
 "From the Inside", a song by Def Leppard, a B-side of the single "Have You Ever Needed Someone So Bad"
 "From the Inside", a song by Depswa from Two Angels and a Dream
 From the Inside, a band fronted by Danny Vaughn